Germaine Guex (April 17, 1904 in Arcachon, France–November 20, 1984 in Lausanne, Switzerland) was a Swiss psychologist. She was particularly known for her work on abandonment syndrome in psychoanalysis.

Born in Arcachon, France, Guex achieved the French baccalauréat and studied at the Rousseau Institute in Geneva. In the 1930s, Guex established a pioneering medical-pedagogical service in Monthey, dedicated to the psychoanalytical treatment of children. Her monograph La névrose d'abandon (1950; English: Abandonment neurosis), later re-published in 1973 under the title Le Syndrome d'abandon, made her reputation international.  In it, she describes "abandonment neurosis" as a type of neurosis distinct from other previously defined categories.

Publications
 The Abandonment Neurosis (The History of Psychoanalysis Series) Karnac Books (2015)

References

Further reading
 Jean-Daniel Zbinden, « L'organisateur André Repond » in Christian Müller (dir.) Portraits de psychiatres (suisses) romands, Payot-Lausanne, 1995,.
 Catherine Fussinger, « Du rôle des femmes et des hommes dans le développement de la pédopsychiatrie en Suisse romande (1930 - 1950) », in Jacqueline Carroy (dir.) Les femmes dans les sciences de l'homme (XIXe-XXe siècles) : inspiratrices, collaboratrices ou créatrices ?, Éditions Seli Arslan, 2005.
 Corinne Dallera, Nadia Lamamra, Du salon à l'usine : vingt portraits de femmes. Un autre regard sur l'histoire du canton de Vaud, 2003, p. 213–228, coédition : CLAFV & ADF & Ouverture (2003)

External links
Biography in the International Dictionary of Psychoanalysis (Thomson Gale, 2005)

1904 births
1964 deaths
People from the canton of Vaud
Swiss psychologists
Swiss women psychologists
Swiss psychoanalysts
People from Arcachon
20th-century psychologists
French emigrants to Switzerland